Chrysocentris clavaria is a moth in the  family Glyphipterigidae. It is known from Malawi.

References

Endemic fauna of Malawi
Glyphipterigidae
Lepidoptera of Malawi
Moths of Sub-Saharan Africa